Scooped may refer to:

Scooped (album), a Pete Townshend album
Scooped, an episode of Toad Patrol
Scoop (news)